Thomas Asbury Combs (February 25, 1868 – April 7, 1935) was an American politician who served as mayor of Lexington, Kentucky from 1904 to 1907  and as a member of the Kentucky Senate from 1908 to 1912 and from 1916 to 1920.

Biography 
Combs was born on February 25, 1868, near Jackson, Kentucky, to Alfred and Esther Combs. In 1875, he moved with his parents to Menifee County. He was married to Vida Downs in 1889 and moved to Powell County in 1890. In October 1893, he moved to Lexington and in 1903 was elected mayor of the city. He was elected to the Kentucky Senate In 1907 and 1915. He died at his home in Lexington on April 7, 1935.

References 

1868 births
1935 deaths
Mayors of Lexington, Kentucky
Democratic Party Kentucky state senators